"Live in the Sky" is a song by American rapper T.I., released on September 5, 2006, as the third and final single from his fourth album King. The song features vocals from American actor and singer Jamie Foxx. The hip hop and R&B song is a tribute and dedicated to T.I.’s deceased friend Big Phil.

Music video
The music video for the song was directed by Chris Robinson.

Charts

Other versions
 "Live in the Sky" [explicit version]
 "Drug Related" (non-album track) [explicit version]

References

2006 singles
Grand Hustle Records singles
Jamie Foxx songs
Music videos directed by Chris Robinson (director)
T.I. songs
Songs written by T.I.
Contemporary R&B ballads
Commemoration songs